The Czech Social Democratic Party (ČSSD) leadership election of 2011 happened as a result of 2010 Czech legislative election which led to the resignation of incumbent leader Jiří Paroubek. The leadership election was considered a duel between Bohuslav Sobotka and Michal Hašek who were main candidates. They were both endorsed by 7 Regional organisations of party. Other candidates included Vladimír Dryml. 609 Delegates were allowed to vote in the election but only 593.

Bohuslav Sobotka won in second round when he received 304 votes while Hašek received 258. Sobotka became the leader of ČSSD. Hašek then became the Vice Chairman of the party.

Opinion Polls

Results

References

Czech Social Democratic Party leadership elections
Social Democratic Party leadership election
Social Democratic Party leadership election
Indirect elections
Czech Social Democratic Party leadership election
Czech Social Democratic Party leadership election